Copelatus burgeoni is a species of diving beetle. It is part of the genus Copelatus in the subfamily Copelatinae of the family Dytiscidae. It was described by Gschwendtner in 1930.

References

burgeoni
Beetles described in 1930